Angélique, Marquise des Anges is a 1964 historical romance film directed by Bernard Borderie and starring Michèle Mercier, Robert Hossein and Jean Rochefort. It is based on the 1956 novel of the same name by Anne and Serge Golon. It was made as a co-production between France, Italy and West Germany

It was shot at the Cinecittà Studios in Rome and the Billancourt Studios in Paris and on location at the Château de Tanlay and Fontenay Abbey. The film's sets were designed by the art director René Moulaert.

The film was a major hit across Continental Europe, and in 1967 was distributed in Britain. It was followed by four sequels starting with Marvelous Angelique.

Synopsis
In mid-17th century France, young Louis XIV is struggling for his throne, beggars and thieves haunt Paris and brigands roam the countryside. Fifth child of an impoverished country nobleman, Angélique de Sancé de Monteloup grows up in the Poitou marshlands. Her logical destiny would be to marry a poor country nobleman, have children and spend her life fighting for a meagre subsistence. Destiny has other plans in store for her. At 17, on returning from her education in a convent, she finds herself betrothed to the rich count Jeoffrey de Peyrac (Jeoffrey Comte de Peyrac de Morens, Lord of Toulouse), 12 years her senior, lame, scarred and reputed to be a wizard. For the sake of her family, Angélique reluctantly agrees to the match but refuses the advances of her husband. Peyrac respects her decision and does not pursue his claim to conjugal rights, wishing rather to seduce than use force.

With the passing of months, Angélique discovers the talents and virtues of her remarkable husband: scientist, musician, philosopher; and to her surprise falls passionately in love with him. But Jeoffrey's unusual way of life is threatened by the ambitions of the Archbishop of Toulouse, and soon arouses the jealousy of the young king himself, Louis XIV. Jeoffrey is arrested and charged with sorcery. Angélique will single-handedly take on the might of the royal court and, survive murder and poison attempts on herself in a supreme effort to save Jeoffrey from the stake, to no avail. Instinctively, her whole being intent on revenge and her determination to survive, Angélique, alone and desperate, plunges into the darkness of the Paris underworld.

Cast

 Michèle Mercier as Angélique Sancé de Monteloup
 Robert Hossein as Jeoffrey de Peyrac
 Jean Rochefort as François Desgrez, solicitor
 Claude Giraud as Philippe de Plessis-Bellières
 Giuliano Gemma as Nicolas Merlot, the childhood friend of Angélique aka Calembredaine
 Jacques Toja as King Louis XIV
 Jacques Castelot as Archbishop of Toulouse
 Charles Regnier as Conan Bécher
 Bernard Woringer as Bernard d'Andijos
 Robert Porte as Monsieur brother of the king
 Madeleine Lebeau as la Grande Demoiselle
 Philippe Lemaire as De Vardes
 François Maistre as Prince de Condé
 Geneviève Fontanel as Carmencita, a former mistress of Jeoffrey
 Jean Topart as Mr Bourié, the prosecutor
 Etchika Choureau as Hortense de Sancé, a sister of Angélique
 Jacques Mignot as Frère Raymond de Monteloup, a brother of Angélique
 Yves Barsacq as Le procureur Fallot
 Bernard Lajarrige as Baron Sancé de Monteloup, Angélique's father
 Jean Ozenne as Marquis de Plessis-Bellières
 Alexandre Rignault as Guillaume Lützen
 Renate Ewert as Margot
 Pierre Hatet as Chevalier de Germontaz
 Robert Hoffmann as Chevalier de Lorraine
 Roberto as Barcarole
 Denise Provence as Barbe
 Jacques Hilling as Mr Molines, notary
 André Rouyer as Clément Tonnelle
 Black Salem as Kouassiba, loyal servant of Jeoffrey
 Claude Vernier as President of the tribunal
 Rosalba Neri as La Polak
 Henri Cogan as Cul-de-Bois
 Serge Marquand as Jactance
 Monique Mélinand as Marquise de Plessis-Bellières
 Sylvie Coste as friend of Carmencita
 Albert Dagnant as The Swiss fugitive
 Michaël Munzer as Beau Garçon
 Paula Dehelly as Angélique's governess
 Le chien Karlo as Sorbonne, Desgrez's dog.
 Claire Athana as Queen Marie-Thérèse of Spain
 Georges Guéret as Fritz Auer, alchemist
 Elisabeth Ercy as Rosine
 Patrick Lemaître as Flipot
 Guido Alberti as Le grand Mathieu
 Jean-Pierre Castaldi as A courtier
Voice dubbing
 Jacques Thébault as French voice of Giuliano Gemma
 Rosy Varte as French voice of Rosalba Neri
 Michèle Montel as French voice of Renate Ewert

Production
Michèle Mercier recalled she had a clause added to her contract not to appear frontally naked on camera. "For the bath scene of the wedding night, I had put plaster on the point of my breasts and a plastic triangle at the bottom. Once in the water, panic, everything came off! I redid the scene. Me, a pharmacist's daughter, I know all about plasters!"-Mercier said.

Box office
In France, the film sold 2,958,684 tickets, making it one of the top ten highest-grossing films of 1964 in the country. It was also the second top-grossing film of the year in West Germany with  ticket sales, and the year's fifth top-grossing film in Italy with  ticket sales. In Spain, the film sold 211,941 tickets upon release in 1964.

In the Soviet Union, the film sold  tickets upon release in 1969. It was the year's second highest-grossing foreign film in the Soviet Union (after the Indian Bollywood film Mamta), and the 31st highest-grossing foreign film ever in the country. In Poland, it did very well, selling millions of tickets, making it one of thirteen high-grossing foreign films in the country in 1968. This adds up to a total of more than 60,212,625 tickets sold worldwide.

Angélique films
1964: Angélique, Marquise des Anges, director Bernard Borderie, starring Michèle Mercier, Robert Hossein, Jean Rochefort
1965: Marvelous Angelique, director Bernard Borderie, starring Michèle Mercier, Claude Giraud, Jean Rochefort 
1966: Angelique and the King, director Bernard Borderie, starring Michèle Mercier, Jean Rochefort
1967: Untamable Angelique, director Bernard Borderie, starring Michèle Mercier, Robert Hossein
1968: Angelique and the Sultan, director Bernard Borderie, starring Michèle Mercier, Robert Hossein

References

 Bibliography 
 Bergfelder, Tim. International Adventures: German Popular Cinema and European Co-Productions in the 1960s''. Berghahn Books, 2005.

External links
 

1960s historical romance films
French historical romance films
German historical romance films
Italian historical romance films
West German films
Films set in the 1670s
Films based on French novels
Films based on historical novels
Films based on romance novels
Films directed by Bernard Borderie
Films produced by Raymond Borderie
Films shot at Billancourt Studios
Films shot at Cinecittà Studios
1960s French-language films
Gloria Film films
1960s Italian films
1960s French films
1960s German films
French-language German films
French-language Italian films